The 1938 South Dakota State Jackrabbits football team was an American football team that represented South Dakota State University in the North Central Conference (NCC) during the 1938 college football season. In its first season under head coach Jack V. Barnes, the team compiled a 3–5 record and was outscored by a total of 109 to 69.

Schedule

References

South Dakota State
South Dakota State Jackrabbits football seasons
South Dakota State Jackrabbits football